Cristina Guzmán is a 1968 Spanish drama film directed by Luis César Amadori and starring Rocío Dúrcal, Arturo Fernández and Isabel Garcés. It is an adaptation of Carmen de Icaza's 1936 novel of the same name, which had previously been turned into a 1943 film.

Cast
 Rocío Dúrcal as Cristina Guzmán/Mara  
 Arturo Fernándezas Alfonso Ribas  
 Isabel Garcés as Mónica  
 Emilio Gutiérrez Caba as Javier  
 Mónica Randall as Laura  
 Rafaela Aparicio as Balbina  
 Skippy Martín
 Francisco Guijar 
 Rafael Alcántara 
 Pedro Mari Sánchez 
 José María Caffarel as Dr. Montero  
 Luis Morris as Goro 
 Lola Herrera 
 José Morales 
 Miguel Ángel Puerto as Bupi  
 Juan Luis Galiardo as Jorge  
 Alfonso del Real

References

Bibliography 
 Bentley, Bernard. A Companion to Spanish Cinema. Boydell & Brewer, 2008.

External links 
 

1968 films
1968 drama films
Spanish drama films
1960s Spanish-language films
Films directed by Luis César Amadori
Films based on Spanish novels
Remakes of Spanish films
Films with screenplays by Rafael J. Salvia
1960s Spanish films